Sharon Carter (also known as Agent 13) is a fictional character appearing in American comic books published by Marvel Comics. She is usually depicted as a secret agent, an ex-field agent of S.H.I.E.L.D. under Nick Fury, and a love interest of Steve Rogers.

In the original comic book continuity, Sharon was the younger sister of Peggy Carter, the possible wartime love interest of Captain America. She was later retconned as Peggy's grand-niece because of the unaging nature of comic book characters.

Emily VanCamp portrays the character in the Marvel Cinematic Universe films Captain America: The Winter Soldier (2014) and Captain America: Civil War (2016) and returned to play the role in the Disney+ series The Falcon and the Winter Soldier (2021), depicted as the supervillain Power Broker, and voices an alternate version in the animated series What If...? (2021).

Publication history
Created by Stan Lee, Jack Kirby and Dick Ayers, Carter first appeared in Tales of Suspense #75 (cover-date March 1966).

Carter was apparently killed in Captain America #233. She was revived in issue #444 by writer Mark Waid, who commented, "The reason she works so well with Cap is because she's a complete cynic and he's a complete idealist".

Sharon Carter appeared as a supporting character in the 2010-2013 Secret Avengers series, from issue #1 (July 2010) through issue #21 (March 2012).

Fictional character biography
Sharon was born in Richmond, Virginia, the daughter of two wealthy Virginians, Harrison and Amanda Carter. She grew up with the stories of her aunt (Margaret "Peggy" Carter) who was a freedom fighter with the French Resistance during World War II.

Inspired by her aunt's adventures, Sharon joins the international security agency S.H.I.E.L.D., and is assigned the code name Agent 13. By this time, Steve Rogers, the patriotic hero known as Captain America, had been revived from suspended animation, and during one of Sharon's earliest missions, he comes to her aid when she is under attack by a mercenary known as Batroc the Leaper. The two of them cross paths often, teaming up on missions against A.I.M., HYDRA, Red Skull, and many others.

Sharon and Rogers eventually fall in love, and she becomes one of the first to know his secret identity. The dangerous nature of Sharon's work strains their relationship, and Rogers wants Sharon to give up her life as a S.H.I.E.L.D. agent.

While working as a S.H.I.E.L.D. liaison with the New York Police Department, Sharon investigates and infiltrates a white supremacist terrorist organization known as the National Force. During one of the National Force's battles with street criminals in Harlem, the National Guard is sent in. Under the effects of a mind-altering gas, Sharon apparently activates a self-destruct device in her National Force uniform and dies. Rogers is shown the event on videotape.

It is later revealed that Sharon's death was faked so she could go on a top secret mission for S.H.I.E.L.D. The mission did not go well, and Nick Fury, S.H.I.E.L.D.'s Executive Director, believed her to have been killed in action; Captain America was not informed of the true circumstances of her "death".

Return
Sharon is not dead, but has been left behind in enemy territory, a captive of the dictator Tap-Kwai. Escaping, she spends several years working as a mercenary, until she encounters a group of Neo-Nazi extremists known as the Kubecult. Learning that they plan to use the Cosmic Cube to return Adolf Hitler to life, Sharon joins forces with the villainous Red Skull to stop them, but they also need Captain America.

At this point, Rogers is suffering health problems: the Super-Soldier serum that gave him his abilities is breaking down, and he has fallen into a coma. The Red Skull is currently occupying a cloned body of Rogers himself, and a transfusion of the Skull's blood, which contains an uncontaminated Super-Soldier formula, restores and revives Rogers. Rogers is shocked to find Sharon alive.

Over the course of the mission to topple the cult he learns that her years out in the cold have made her grimmer and more ruthless, and the two of them do not renew their relationship when Sharon rejoins S.H.I.E.L.D. A romantic tension still exists: Sharon teases him about his naïveté, such as when he lets a family of squatters stay in his apartment. The two battle the Red Skull, who possesses a cosmic cube that can do whatever he wishes. Sharon and Captain America argue about killing the Skull, with Sharon urging Rogers to use an energy-based shield that she has given him. Sharon tries and fails to kill the Red Skull, but he is soon defeated through trickery. The energy shield is lost in the time-stream.

Soon afterwards, Sharon assists Captain America in several cases where patriotic Americans go on violent rampages under the influence of a supernatural entity named Nightmare, who has found a way to influence this dimension through the 'American dream.' Sharon and Cap battle many patriotic people, including a temporarily insane U.S. Agent, and ultimately Sharon has to face down a Captain America under the influence of Nightmare.

21st century
In the absence of Nick Fury, Sharon serves a brief term as Executive Director of S.H.I.E.L.D. She returns to field work, reporting directly to the new Executive Director, Maria Hill, as a liaison officer specifically assigned to support and report on Captain America's activities. While investigating the whereabouts of Jack Monroe, she is abducted by the Winter Soldier and used as bait to lure Captain America into a trap set by General Aleksander Lukin. She and Captain America later resume their relationship while on a field mission investigating the activities of the Winter Soldier.

During the "Civil War" storyline, Sharon is initially a supporter of the Superhuman Registration Act, but she is averse to actually aiding in the capture of her lover, Captain America, who is the leader of the "Secret Avengers" opposed to the Act. At the same time, she is an unknowing pawn of the Red Skull and his associate Doctor Faustus. She later comes into contact with Nick Fury's underground organization, even as she is reassigned to the S.H.I.E.L.D. task force charged with locating Fury. She switches her allegiance to Captain America, citing the death of Goliath as the primary reason; it is unclear how much of this is the result of Faustus's influence.

In a follow-up, a sniper shoots Steve Rogers in the shoulder while he walks up the steps to the Federal Court. In the ensuing crowd chaos, Rogers is shot three times in the abdomen with a pistol, and later appears to die of his wounds. It is later revealed that the plan was orchestrated by the Red Skull; the sniper was Crossbones, and Sharon Carter shot Rogers in the abdomen while under a hypnotic suggestion by Dr. Faustus.

Sharon is still under the influence of Doctor Faustus, who uses her to disable Black Widow and Falcon before she joins the Red Skull's organization as a minion. She is apparently pregnant with Rogers's child, but she loses the baby during a fight with the Red Skull's daughter, Sin, during one of several attempts to escape. Later, Sharon says that she, not Sin, stabbed her womb and caused the miscarriage, to keep the Red Skull from getting his hands on anything of hers. Doctor Faustus makes her forget ever being pregnant, and he also gives her the tools to escape. Sharon frees herself, killing Aleksander Lukin in the process (and narrowly missing killing the Red Skull himself), before being found by Black Widow and the Falcon. Iron Man and Falcon decide to tell her about her pregnancy at a later date, after sufficient recovery time. As a result, Sharon decided to leave S.H.I.E.L.D.

Sharon Carter is featured in the storyline Captain America: Reborn, where she learns that she killed Captain America and plans to figure out a way to revive him. Unfortunately, Norman Osborn also plans to revive Captain America, so that he can complete the Red Skull's plan to transfer his consciousness into Steve's body and have him lead the Avengers to increase his popularity. He frames Sharon as an accomplice in Rogers' murder and threatens to kill the second Captain America if she doesn't turn herself in, which she does. She is brought to Latveria, where she is attached to a machine to bring Rogers back, but with the Red Skull controlling his body. Mr. Fantastic determines that Sharon has chronal tracers in her blood meant to pull Steve to her. She surrenders to Norman Osborn in order to save the life of Bucky (who had already escaped, unbeknownst to her), and she is delivered to the Red Skull and Dr. Doom, who use her to retrieve Steve, with the Skull's mind in control. Sharon ultimately escapes with the help of Henry Pym, and uses the Red Skull's own ship to blow him up. Reconciling with Steve (who was able to assert control over his body), they take some time off at her Virginia estate.

Sharon was a member of an Avengers team, and the Secret Avengers, in Ed Brubaker's series of the same name.

Sharon appeared to sacrifice herself to stop Arnim Zola's massive flying fortress from invading Earth but she is alive in Zola's captivity and she is found by Falcon and Jet Black.

When Sharon Carter and S.H.I.E.L.D. arrest Tomoe and her Biohack Ninjas, she meets Riri Williams who helped Pepper Potts defeat them.

During the "Secret Empire" storyline, Sharon Carter is on the S.H.I.E.L.D. Helicarrier at the time when Captain America, whose history was rewritten by Red Skull's clone using the powers of Kobik to make him a Hydra sleeper agent, reveals his association with Hydra as the Hydra Helicarrier rams into the S.H.I.E.L.D. Helicarrier that Sharon Carter is on as Doctor Faustus arrests her. Sharon Carter pretends to be brainwashed by Doctor Faustus, but incapacitates him by spiking his tea with a non-lethal toxin.

Sharon Carter later forms the Daughters of Liberty, who work to clear Captain America's name after he is framed for the death of Thunderbolt Ross.

Powers and abilities
Sharon is a highly trained martial artist and extremely adept at various fighting techniques. She is highly trained in espionage, weapons, firearms and computers. After being brainwashed by Doctor Faustus into shooting Captain America, she spent some time training herself to resist similar brainwashing attempts in future, to the extent that she tricked Faustus into thinking he had brainwashed her again and attacked him while his guard was down.

Other versions

In the alternate future of the Earth X miniseries, Sharon Carter has fallen victim to Hydra, a squid-based alien life form that absorbs minds and people to expand.

Sharon Carter is introduced into the Marvel Mangaverse continuity as the supposed orchestrator of the destruction  of almost the entire superhuman population in the Marvel Mangaverse. It turns out that she has been under mind control. She becomes the director of S.H.I.E.L.D. when Nick Fury supposedly dies.

The Ultimate Marvel version of Sharon Carter is also an agent of S.H.I.E.L.D., but is much closer to the environment of Spider-Man. She often appears as one of a pair of wise-cracking S.H.I.E.L.D. agents, the other one is Jimmy Woo. She can display humor at times, but mostly keeps her mouth shut in public. As seen in Ultimate Spider-Man #46, she is a practicing Christian and has strong morals, which lead her to want S.H.I.E.L.D. to destroy individuals such as Doctor Octopus rather than 'lock them away for poking'. Carter and Woo survive the Super-Villains escape that occurs in Ultimate Six. Carter is seen next in the Silver Sable arc and Woo in the Hobgoblin arc. Carter is later involved with the Clone Saga arc, telling the people evacuated from Peter Parker's neighborhood that all is well, and Agent Woo is later seen in the Death of a Goblin arc, letting Carol Danvers know about the Goblin's most recent murder. In a 2008 storyline, Carter is the acting head of S.H.I.E.L.D.. She asks the Fantastic Four to investigate a confusing situation at Project Pegasus.

Sharon Carter and Steve Rogers have a daughter named Sharon Rogers. Created as part of Captain America's 75th anniversary, she is from an alternate timeline where she now serves as Captain America.

In other media

Television
Sharon Carter appeared in The Marvel Super Heroes, voiced by Peg Dixon.

Film
A variation of the character named Sharon Stewart in Captain America, portrayed by Kim Gillingham. This version is a civilian and the daughter of Bernie Stewart-Cooperman. After the death of her parents at the hands of the Red Skull's daughter Valentina de Santis, Stewart accompanies Captain America to Italy to defeat the villains.

Marvel Cinematic Universe

Emily VanCamp portrays Sharon Carter in media set in the Marvel Cinematic Universe. She appears in the live-action films Captain America: The Winter Soldier (2014) and Captain America: Civil War (2016) as well as the Disney+ miniseries The Falcon and the Winter Soldier (2021). Additionally, VanCamp voices an alternate timeline version in the Disney+ animated series What If...? episode "What If... Zombies?!"

Video games
 The Ultimate Marvel incarnation of Sharon Carter appears in Ultimate Spider-Man, voiced by Jane Hajduk.
 Sharon Carter appears in Marvel Heroes. The character as Agent 13 was added later as a "Team-Up" character.
 Sharon Carter as Agent 13 appears as a playable character in Marvel: Future Fight.   
 Sharon Carter appears as a playable character in Lego Marvel's Avengers, voiced by Jennifer Hale.
 Sharon Carter as Agent 13 appears as a playable character in Marvel Avengers Academy, voiced by Linnea Sage.
 Sharon Carter as Agent 13 appears as a playable character in Marvel: Avengers Alliance 2.

References

External links
Carter, Sharon Marvel Directory: Sharon Carter (Agent 13)

Avengers (comics) characters
Comics characters introduced in 1966
Marvel Comics television characters
Fictional characters from Virginia
Fictional Central Intelligence Agency personnel
Fictional American secret agents
Fictional women soldiers and warriors
Marvel Comics martial artists
Marvel Comics film characters
Marvel Comics female superheroes
Fictional special forces personnel
Fictional spymasters
Characters created by Stan Lee
Characters created by Jack Kirby
Characters created by Dick Ayers
S.H.I.E.L.D. agents